Teresa Machado (22 July 1969 – 28 February 2020) was a Portuguese discus thrower and shot putter. Her personal best discus throw was 65.40 metres, achieved in May 1998 in São Jacinto.

Competition record

External links

1969 births
2020 deaths
Portuguese female discus throwers
Portuguese female shot putters
Athletes (track and field) at the 1992 Summer Olympics
Athletes (track and field) at the 1996 Summer Olympics
Athletes (track and field) at the 2000 Summer Olympics
Athletes (track and field) at the 2004 Summer Olympics
Olympic athletes of Portugal
People from Ílhavo
Sportspeople from Aveiro District